Pioneer Telephone is a privately held company with headquarters in Portland, Maine, United States, it was founded by Peter Bouchard, who continues to run the company today. It is a facility-based telecommunication carrier of long-distance, local and UCaas telephone service in the United States. As of October 2011, Pioneer Telephone had more than 2,700,000 customers in 48 states.

In 2005, Pioneer Telephone purchased the long-distance telephone business of bankrupt Adelphia Communications Corporation for about $1.1B;  the sale was completed later that year. Adelphia's phone service had 1,110,000 customers in 27 states(telephone & long-distance services).

In November 2008, Pioneer Telephone purchased all the residential and small-to-medium-sized business customers from Level 3 Communications in Denver, CO Pioneer's upper management  stated that they would roll out local service in 15 states in 2009.

References

https://www.edockets.state.mn.us/EFiling/edockets/searchDocuments.do?method=showPoup&documentId=%7B332114BC-19E8-4B11-ADC4-2AA867F55F3E%7D&documentTitle=5375742

Telecommunications companies of the United States
Privately held companies based in Maine
Companies based in Portland, Maine